Women Friendly Workplace Awards (shortened to WFWA Awards), is Sri Lanka's first-ever gender equality accolade. It recognises public and private organisations that encourage and empower women at the workplace in Sri Lanka. It was inaugurated in 2021, with it first being held on 2 November 2021, at the Cinnamon Grand. It was initiated by Satyn Magazine and AICPA & CIMA

WFWA 2022 was held on the 30 September, at the Kingsbury Hotel, Colombo.

Prize categories 
 Top 10 Places to Work for Women
 Honourable Mentions

2021
The inaugural award show was held on 2 November 2021 at Cinnamon Grand, at the Atrium Lobby. The Top Ten winners were AIA, CBL, Commercial Bank, London Stock Exchange Business Services, NSB, People's Bank, Seylan Bank, DFCC, HNB Assurance, and LOLC.

Following which Honourable Mentions were awarded to NDB, SDB, Acuity Knowledge Partners, Bio Foods and WNS Global Services.

The Chief Guest was Ms. Sarah Twigg (Programme Manager – Women in Work – Sri Lanka at IFC), and the Guest of Honour was Ms Farzana Jameel PC (Senior Additional Solicitor General of the Attorney General's Department).

The panel of judges included – Ravi Abeysuriya, Manohari Abeysekera, Dumindra Ratnayaka, Prof. Arosha Adikaram, Jeevan Thyagarajah, Zahara Ansary and Nayomini R. Weerasooriya.

The awards aimed to help achieve Sri Lanka's commitment to 5 SDG; which aims to provide women equal rights and opportunities, including the right to live free without discrimination, this includes workplace discrimination, and any other sort of violence.

2022

Pre-Networking Event
WFWA commenced its 2nd edition, starting off with an networking and learning event, which was held on 25 March 2022 at Hotel Ramada, Colombo. The event panel consisted of Ms. Avanthi Colombage, Ms. Sandra De Zoysa, Ms Ananya Sabharwal, Ms. Sarah Twigg, and Nayomini R. Weerasooriya.

2nd Edition
The 2nd edition of the WFWA was held on 30 September, at the Kingsbury Hotel, Colombo. 

The Panel of Judges, was headed by Prof. Arosha Adikaram - Chair Professor in HR Management, University of Colombo. The other Judges were Ken Vijayakumar - President CIPM Sri Lanka & DGM – HR at Baurs, Zahara Ansary - Country Manager, for CIMA in Sri Lanka, Dr. Beshan Kulapala - Tech Entrepreneur and Nayomini R. Weerasooriya - Founder/Editor of Satyn Magazine.

2023
WFWA 2023 edition was officially launched on March 1 2023, jointly presented by Satyn Magazine and AICPA & CIMA. The presentation of a Paper on 'Good Practices for Women that sheds light on the Status of Women in the Sri Lankan Workplace', marked the launch of the 2023 edition.

Recipients

References 

The Sunday Times Business Section
Satynmag.com & CIMA Sri Lanka initiate “ Women Friendly Work Place” Awards
Satynmag.com in global partnership with Catalyst for Women Entrepreneurship
Sri Lanka : Seylan Bank among Top Ten in Sri Lanka’s first ever ‘Women Friendly Workplace Awards 2021’
Satynmag.com and CIMA Sri Lanka Women Friendly Workplace Awards on 2 November | Daily FT
India's Catalyst For Women Entrepreneurship And Srilanka's Satynmag.Com Announces A Global Partnership
Seylan Bank among Top Ten in Sri Lanka's first ever ‘Women Friendly Workplace Awards 2021’
Seylan Bank among Top Ten in Sri Lanka's first ever ‘Women Friendly Workplace Awards 2021’
Seylan Bank among Top Ten in Sri Lanka's first ever ‘Women Friendly Workplace Awards 2021’ | Banks in Sri Lanka | Commercial Banks in Sri Lanka
International Women’s Day - Life Online

See also

 List of awards honoring women
 List of business and industry awards

Awards established in 2021
Awards honoring women
Sri Lankan awards
2021 establishments in Sri Lanka
Wikipedia categories named after Sri Lankan awards
Awards
Society of Sri Lanka
Women's rights in Sri Lanka